Akshay Roopak Puri (born 20 October 2003) is a Singaporean cricketer who plays for the Singapore cricket team. He made his T20I debut for Singapore, on 28 June 2022,  against Malaysia. Later that month, he was named in Singapore's Twenty20 International (T20I) squad for the 2022 Singa Championship Series. The following month, he was named in Singapore's squad for the 2022 ICC Men's T20 World Cup Global Qualifier B tournament.

In July 2022, he was named in Singapore's squad for the 2022 Canada Cricket World Cup Challenge League A tournament. He made his List A debut on 28 July 2022, for Singapore against Qatar.

References

External links
 

2003 births
Living people
Singaporean cricketers
Singapore Twenty20 International cricketers
Singaporean sportspeople of Indian descent